The Kushabhau Thakre Inter-state bus terminus also known as Bhopal ISBT or ISBT, located in Bhopal is the newest Inter State Bus Terminals inaugurated on 1 November 2010 in central India. It operates bus services between Bhopal and many cities in India.

References 

Transport in Bhopal
Bus stations in Madhya Pradesh
2010  establishments in Madhya Pradesh
Transport infrastructure completed in 2010